The 1987 Women's Hockey Olympic Qualifier was held in Edinburgh, Scotland in April 1987. Six nations took part, and they played a round robin.

Final rankings
Teams in bold are qualified

References
Overview on FIH-site
Hockey Sport, April 2000, Issue 204

1988
1987 in women's field hockey
International sports competitions in Edinburgh
International women's field hockey competitions hosted by Scotland
Qualification
Field hockey
Women's Field Hockey Olympic Qualifier
Women's Field Hockey Olympic Qualifier
1980s in Edinburgh
Women's Field Hockey Olympic Qualifier